Miguel Ángel Félix Gallardo (born January 8, 1946), commonly referred to by his aliases El Jefe de Jefes ("The Boss of Bosses") and El Padrino ("The Godfather"), is a convicted Mexican drug lord and a former Federal Judicial Police agent. He was one of the founders of the Guadalajara Cartel in the 1970s. 
Throughout the 1980s, the cartel controlled much of the drug trafficking in Mexico and the corridors along the Mexico–United States border.

Félix Gallardo was arrested in 1989 for putting in place the murder of Drug Enforcement Administration (DEA) agent Enrique "Kiki" Camarena. He was serving his 40-year sentence at the Altiplano maximum-security prison but was transferred to a medium-security facility in 2014 due to his declining health.

Early Life
Born on a ranch in Bellavista, on the outskirts of Culiacán, Sinaloa, Félix Gallardo graduated from high school and studied business in college. He took a job as a Mexican Federal Judicial Police agent. He worked as a family bodyguard for the governor of Sinaloa state Leopoldo Sánchez Celis, whose political connections helped Félix Gallardo to build his drug trafficking organization. He was also the godfather of Sánchez 
Celis' son, Rodolfo.

Félix Gallardo started working for drug traffickers brokering corruption of state officials, and together with Rafael Caro Quintero and Ernesto Fonseca Carrillo, who previously worked in the Avilés criminal organization, took control of the trafficking routes after Avilés was killed in a police shootout.

Connections to Colombian cartels
In the early 1980s, drug interdiction efforts increased throughout Florida, which was then the major shipping destination for illegal drug traffickers. As a result, the Colombian cartels began to utilize Mexico as their primary trans-shipment point.

Juan Matta-Ballesteros was the Guadalajara Cartel's primary connection to the Colombian cartels, as he had originally introduced 
Félix Gallardo's predecessor, Alberto Sicilia Falcón, to Santiago Ocampo of the Cali Cartel, one of the largest Colombian drug cartels. Rather than taking cash payments for their services, the smugglers in the Guadalajara Cartel took a 50% cut of the cocaine they transported from Colombia. This proved to be extremely profitable for them, with some estimating that the trafficking network, then operated by Félix 
Gallardo, Ernesto Carrillo and Rafael Quintero, was pulling in approximately $5 billion annually.

Until the end of the 1980s, the Guadalajara Cartel headed by Félix Gallardo (comprising what is now known today as the Sinaloa, Tijuana, Juarez and Pacifico Sur cartels) had nearly monopolized the illegal drug trade in Mexico.

Murder of DEA agent Kiki Camarena
In 1980, DEA special agent Enrique "Kiki" Camarena was assigned to the Administration's resident agency in Guadalajara. Working through informants, Camarena discovered cartel marijuana plantations in Zacatecas state. The plantations were raided and destroyed. In 1984, Mexican soldiers, backed by helicopters, destroyed an even larger 1,000 hectare (≈2,500 acre) marijuana plantation known as "Rancho Búfalo" in Chihuahua, known to be protected by Mexican DFS intelligence agents, as part of "Operation Godfather". Thousands of farmers worked the fields at Rancho Búfalo, and the annual production was later valued at 8 billion. All of this took place with the knowledge of local police, politicians, and the military.

Camarena was beginning to expose the connections among drug traffickers, Mexican law enforcement, and high-ranking government officials within the Partido Revolucionario Institucional (PRI), which Félix Gallardo considered to be a major threat to the Guadalajara cartel's operations throughout Mexico.

In response, Félix Gallardo reportedly ordered the kidnapping of Camarena. On February 7, 1985, Jalisco police officers on the cartel's payroll kidnapped Camarena as he left the U.S. consulate in Guadalajara. His helicopter pilot, Alfredo Zavala Avelar, was kidnapped shortly afterward. They were brought to a residence located at 881 Lope de Vega in the colonia of Jardines del Bosque, in the western section of the city of Guadalajara, owned by Rafael Caro Quintero, where they were tortured and interrogated over a period of 30 hours. On February 9, Camarena was tortured and murdered. Autopsy results indicated that he died
when his skull was perforated with a drill. He was injected with adrenaline and other drugs to be kept awake during his torture and interrogation. His body, wrapped in plastic, was found with that of pilot Alfredo Zavala Avelar, in a shallow hole on a ranch in Michoacan state.

The murder prompted one of the largest DEA homicide investigations ever undertaken, Operation Leyenda. A special unit was dispatched to coordinate the investigation in Mexico, where corrupt officials were being implicated.

Investigators identified Félix Gallardo and his two close associates, Ernesto Fonseca Carrillo and Rafael Caro Quintero, as the primary suspects in the kidnapping. Under pressure from the US, Fonseca and Quintero were apprehended, but Félix Gallardo still enjoyed political protection.

Arrest 
Félix Gallardo kept a low profile and, in 1987, moved with his family to Guadalajara. He was arrested in Mexico on April 8, 1989, and was charged by the authorities in Mexico and the United States with the kidnapping and murder of DEA agent Enrique Camarena, as well as racketeering, drug smuggling, and multiple violent crimes.

According to US officials, Félix Gallardo also spent time at the Sinaloa governor's house as a guest, which governor Antonio Toledo Corro has denied. When asked about his association with Félix Gallardo, governor Toledo said he was "unaware of any outstanding arrest warrants" against Félix Gallardo.

The arrest of Félix Gallardo was the catalyst for exposing the widespread corruption at political and law enforcement levels in Mexico. Within days of Félix Gallardo's arrest, and under pressure from the media, several police commanders were arrested with as many as 90 officers deserting.

Félix Gallardo's arrest also led to the dismantling of the Guadalajara Cartel, as key members of the federation chose to withdraw and form their own cartels, relying on violence to claim various territories and trafficking routes. The continuous disputes and conflict among the leaders would breed political, social, and military chaos, and eventually lead to the Mexican Drug War.

Incarceration
Félix Gallardo was initially sentenced to 40 years of prison. After serving 28 years, a 2017 retrial sentenced him to an additional 37 years. While incarcerated, Félix Gallardo  remained one of Mexico's major traffickers, maintaining his organization via mobile phone.

After his arrest, Félix Gallardo decided to divide up the trade he controlled as it would be more efficient and less likely to be brought down by law enforcement. Félix Gallardo instructed his lawyer to convene the nation's top drug narcos in 1989 at a house in the resort of Acapulco where he designated the plazas or territories. The Tijuana route would go to his nephews, the Arellano Felix brothers. The Ciudad Juárez route would go to the Carrillo Fuentes family. Miguel Caro Quintero would run the Sonora corridor. Joaquín Guzmán Loera and Héctor Luis Palma Salazar were left the Pacific coast operations, with Ismael Zambada García joining them soon after and thus becoming the Sinaloa Cartel, which was not a party to the 1989 pact.

When Félix Gallardo was transferred to a high-security prison in 1993, he lost any remaining control over the other drug lords.

As he aged, Félix Gallardo complained that he lived in poor conditions while in jail. He says that he suffers from vertigo, deafness, loss of an eye, and blood circulation problems. He lives in a 240 × 440 cm (8x14ft) cell, which he is not allowed to leave, even to use the recreational area. In March 2013, Félix Gallardo started a legal process to continue his prison sentence at home when he reached his 70th birthday (8 January 2016). On 29 April 2014, a Mexican federal court denied Félix Gallardo's petition to be transferred from the maximum-security prison to a medium-security one. On 18 December 2014, federal authorities approved his request to transfer to a medium-security prison in Guadalajara (State of Jalisco), due to his declining health.

On 20 February 2019, a court in Mexico City denied his request to complete the remainder of his sentence at his home. The court stated that Félix Gallardo's defense did not provide them with sufficient evidence to prove that his health issues were putting his life at risk.

On September 12, 2022 it was reported that Félix Gallardo was granted house arrest and will be moved on September 13, 2022. Mexican President Andrés Manuel López Obrador released a statement about his transfer. "I do not want anyone to suffer. I do not want anyone to be in jail."

Memoirs 
In 2008, the investigative journalist Diego Enrique Osorno was able to contact Félix Gallardo through the latter's 13-year-old son. Félix Gallardo secretly wrote about his life and passed the hand-written notes to Osorno. The memoirs include narrative about his arrest and presentation before police, and explains a bit of his family tree, jumping from one topic to another.  Selections of the 35 pages were published in the Mexican magazine Gatopardo, with background by the journalist.

Family 
Upon his arrest at least nine of Miguel Ángel Félix Gallardo's nieces and nephews took over different roles within the organization to form the Arellano Félix Organization, also known as the Tijuana Cartel. Another niece, Sandra Ávila Beltrán, is a former member of the Sinaloa Cartel.

Members of the Arellano Félix Organization (Tijuana Cartel)
Alicia Arellano Félix is his niece.
Benjamín Arellano Félix (Incarcerated), a member and former leader of the Arellano Félix Organization, is his nephew. 
Carlos Arellano Félix is his nephew.
Eduardo Arellano Félix (Incarcerated) is his nephew.
Enedina Arellano Félix de Toledo, Leader of the Arellano Félix Organization, is his niece.
Fabian Arellano Corona is his grandnephew.
Francisco Javier Arellano Félix (Incarcerated) is his nephew.
Francisco Rafael Arellano Félix (Deceased) was his nephew.
Javier Benjamin Briseño Arellano is his grandnephew. Has also went by the name: Javier Gallardo and his son Javier R. Gallardo is estranged and unknown.
Luis Fernando Arellano Félix is his nephew.
Luis Fernando Sánchez Arellano (Incarcerated) is his grandnephew.
Ramón Arellano Félix (Deceased), a member and former leader of the Arellano Félix Organization, is his nephew. 
Sinaloa Cartel
Sandra Ávila Beltrán, a former member of the Sinaloa Cartel, is his niece.

In popular culture
 In second season of the Colombian TV Series El cartel, Félix Gallardo is portrayed by the Mexican actor  as the character of 'El Golfo'.
 In TV Series Alias El Mexicano, he is portrayed by the Mexican actor .
 In seasons 1, 2 and 3 of the Netflix series Narcos: Mexico (2018), Félix Gallardo is portrayed by Mexican actor Diego Luna.
 A character based on Gallardo is featured briefly in the 2017 television series El Chapo.

See also

Mexican Drug War
War on Drugs

References

1946 births
Fugitives
Guadalajara Cartel traffickers
Juárez Cartel traffickers
Living people
Mexican drug traffickers
Mexican drug war
Mexican prisoners and detainees
People from Culiacán
Sinaloa Cartel traffickers
Tijuana Cartel traffickers